Lemon liqueur is a liqueur made from lemons, liquor, and sugar.  It is light to bright lemon yellow in color; intensely lemony in flavor; clear, cloudy, or opaque;  and sweet or sweet and sour.  Lemon zest is used, water may be added, and the liqueur is not sour.  Milk or cream may be added to make a lemon cream liqueur. Lemon juice is not used to alter the taste and affect the stability of the lemon liqueur.

Production
To produce the Lemon liqueur requires sugar, water, lemon zest, liquor, and time to mature.  Lemon zest is soaked in high proof neutral spirits to extract from it the lemon oil (an essential oil).  The extraction is then diluted with simple syrup.

Variations 
Different varieties of lemon are used to produce different flavors. The variety of lemon used is usually dictated by region. Various alcohols can be used to give distinct flavors. A higher proof alcohol maximizes extraction of the lemon flavor, whereas darker alcohols add complexity of flavor.  
Many commercial brands of lemon liqueur are produced in Italy, in several styles (see Italian liqueur).

Customs
In Italy, especially in Campania, lemon liqueur is consumed as a chaser (ammazzacaffè) to coffee.

See also

 Kitron, a Greek liqueur from citron
 Limoncello, an Italian lemon liqueur
 Lemon Drop, a cocktail
 List of lemon dishes and beverages

References

 The Herb Society of America's Essential Guide to Growing and Cooking with Herbs - Katherine K. Schlosser - Google Books
 Adventure Guide Naples, Sorrento, The Amalfi Coast - Marina Carter - Google Books

External links
 

Citrus liqueurs
Italian liqueurs
Lemon drinks